Silsila Pyaar Ka is an Indian television series that aired on STAR Plus from 4 January to 5 June 2016. It was produced by Rashmi Sharma and Pawan Kumar Marut for Rashmi Sharma Telefilms and starred Abhay Vakil and Chhavi Pandey. It is the remake of the Star Jalsha show Tumi Asbe Bole.

Plot 
Raunak Tiwari, a college student falls for and writes love letter to Kajal Saxena. His overly possessive mother Janki forces Akshay Bansal, his friend to sign the letter with his own name. Enchanted, Kajal marries him. Raunak is heartbroken.

5 years later
Akshay and Kajal have a daughter Sakshi, who has health problems since birth. Kajal learns how Janki forced Akshay; she tries to mend broken relationship between Raunak and Akshay. He dies in an accident. To fulfill his last wish, Kajal weds Raunak. She intends to find Akshay's killer, who turns out to be Raunak's uncle Pradeep.

Kajal finds out Randhir, Raunak's sick father who was being mistreated by Janki. He recovers. Kajal slowly falls for Raunak. Eventually, Janki realises her mistakes and the family is united.

Cast

Main
Abhay Vakil as Raunak Tiwari
 Chhavi Pandey as Kajal Saxena/Bansal/Tiwari
 Sehban Azim as Akshay Bansal

Recurring
 Shilpa Shirodkar as Janki Sanyal/Tiwari, Raunak's mother
 Vaquar Sheikh as Randhir Tiwari, Raunak's father
Tvisha Solanki as Sakshi Bansal/Tiwari, Kajal and Akshay's daughter
 Sheezan Mohammed as Vinay Saxena, Kajal's brother and Neeti's husband
 Sheen Dass as Neeti Tiwari/Saxena, Raunak's sister and Vinay's wife
 Vishal_Bhardwaj_(actor) as Kartik Dave, Neeti's childhood friend and Sanjana's love interest
Ravi Gossain as Harsh Chandra Sanyal, Raunak's maternal uncle
Rakesh Kukreti as Pradeep Tiwari, Raunak's paternal uncle and Sanket and Sanjana's father
Khyati Keswani as Vidhi Tiwari, Raunak's paternal aunt and Sanket and Sanjana's mother
Abhishek Bajaj as Sanket Tiwari, Raunak's cousin
Mrinal Singh as Sanjana Tiwari, Raunak's cousin
Guddi Maruti as Sonali Tiwari, Raunak's fraternal aunt
 Karishma Sharma as Munmun Mehra, Raunak's fiancé
 Sanjeev Jogtiyani as Sanjay
 Sumit Bhardwaj as Prateek
 Mohena Singh as Aarti
  Ahmad Harhash as Veer Pratap Singh

Production

Development
Initially titled as Saajan, it was later renamed Silsila Pyaar Ka before its premiere.

After a month of launch, in February Sehban Azim's character was killed abruptly, making his sudden exit, for bringing a twist. However, soon in May, he was made to return when makers approached him.

In early March 2016, Shilpa Shirodkar while enacting a sequence while walking in staircase lost her balance and fell. With her unable to walk due to her injured back, her role was tweaked for her to take rest for few days. Later, in the same month, Abhay Vakil got injured when iron nails pierced his toes while running for a sequence. In April, the shoot was halted for a while when a rod fell on the head of the lead actress Chhavi Pandey who was hurt while shooting.

References

External links
 Official website

StarPlus original programming
2016 Indian television series debuts
2016 Indian television series endings
Indian television soap operas